Ganoderma lobatum is a fungal plant pathogen.

References

External links 
 Index Fungorum
 USDA ARS Fungal Database

Fungal plant pathogens and diseases
Ganodermataceae
Fungi described in 1832
Taxa named by Lewis David de Schweinitz